On Dangerous Ground is a 1952 film noir directed by Nicholas Ray and starring Ida Lupino and Robert Ryan.

The title may also refer to:

On Dangerous Ground (1915 film), directed by Lucius Henderson
On Dangerous Ground (1917 film), directed by Robert Thornby 

British title of the 1986 film Choke Canyon
"Silent Running (On Dangerous Ground)", a Mike + The Mechanics song written for the film
On Dangerous Ground, a Jack Higgins novel
On Dangerous Ground (1996 film), a Rob Lowe film based on Higgins' novel
On Dangerous Ground, a crime novel by Lesley Horton

See also
Dangerous Ground (disambiguation)